Farukh Abitov (born 4 December 1988) is a retired Kyrgyzstani footballer, who is well known as a defence player of Dordoi Bishkek.

International career
He was a member of the Kyrgyzstan national football team.

References

1988 births
Living people
Kyrgyzstan international footballers
Kyrgyzstani footballers
Kyrgyzstani expatriate footballers
Footballers at the 2006 Asian Games
Expatriate footballers in Uzbekistan
Kyrgyzstani expatriate sportspeople in Uzbekistan
Association football defenders
Asian Games competitors for Kyrgyzstan